Claude Bébéar (born 1935) is a French businessman. He is the former CEO of AXA.

Biography

Early life
Claude Bébéar was born on 29 July 1935 in Issac, France. He graduated from the Lycée Saint-Louis and the École Polytechnique. He was trained at the Armoured Cavalry Branch Training School in Saumur and did his military service in Algeria. He then received a diploma from the Institute of Actuaries of France.

Career
He started his career at Anciennes Mutuelles, up until he became CEO after André Sahut d'Izarn's death in 1975. In 1985, it became known as AXA.

He helped out Jean-Marie Messier from Vivendi. He was involved in the ouster of the chairmen of Rhodia. 

He is a member of the board of directors of Vivendi, BNP Paribas and Schneider Electric, and has been a member of Le Siècle. He is also Chairman of the Institut du mécénat de solidarité and the Institut Montaigne.

Private life
He is Roman Catholic, widowed with three children, two of whom were adopted from South Korea. In 2007, he was worth 106 million euros.

Bibliography
Le courage de réformer (André Babeau, Odile Jacob, 2002)
Ils vont tuer le capitalisme  (May 2003)

References

External links
"An hour with former CEO of AXA Claude Bebear", Charlie Rose

1935 births
Living people
École Polytechnique alumni
French Roman Catholics
Grand Officiers of the Légion d'honneur
Vivendi
BNP Paribas people
Schneider Electric people
Officers of the Ordre national du Mérite
French company founders